This is the complete chapter and colony roll of Xi Psi Phi Professional Dental Fraternity.

Collegiate chapters 
Following are the fraternity's collegiate chapters. Active chapters are indiated in bold. Inactive chapter names and institutions are indicated in italic.

Notes

See also 
 Professional fraternities and sororities

References

External links

Student organizations established in 1889
Dental organizations
Lists of chapters of United States student societies by society
chapters
1889 establishments in Michigan